Antoine Redier (7 July 1873 – 27 July 1954) was a French writer who was leader of the far-right Légion organization in the 1920s.

Early years

Antoine Redier was born on 7 July 1873 in Meudon, the eldest of eight children of Jean Rédier and his wife Anna Thubert. 
He was grandson of the watchmaker Jean Antoine Joseph Redier.
He wrote many books, including Méditations dans la tranchée (1916), which won an awards from the Académie française.

After World War I, Rédier became the leader of a veterans group, and was the editor of the Revue française. 
He was nationalist, anti-communist and socially conservative.
He believed in the virtues of a family unit headed by a patriarch, 
and generally believed in the virtues of anti-Republican virility.
He supported the proposals of Fernand Boverat for family suffrage, which would enhance the status of the father in the family.

Political career

Redier founded the Légion, or Ligue, in 1924. Although the goals were obscure, Rédier expected that the veterans would take power, and a leader (chef) would emerge. 
The ligue had 10,000 members, with sections in the main provincial centers.
From 15,000 to 20,000 copies of the movement's newspaper, Le Rassemblement. were printed each week.
The Légion was in favor of a corporatist system of government and attacked the left and democracy. 
Its program said it stood "above the interests of a single group" and would "gather all those ... who put the salvation of France above all else."
General Édouard de Curières de Castelnau, President of the Fédération Nationale Catholique provided funding to Rédier's Légion and to the Jeunesses Patriotes founded by Pierre Taittinger.

The Légion merged into the Jeunesses Patriotes on 1 July 1925, bringing a more extreme element into Taittinger's vaguely right-wing organization.
Redier became vice-president of the merged organization, and began to radicalize the organization.
When Georges Valois launched his rival Faisceau organization, Rédier was in favor of a merger.
Large numbers of Ligue members did desert to the Faisceau.
By 15 December Redier had left the Jeunesses patriotes, and urged all Légion members to follow his lead.
He intended to transfer to the Faisceau, but held back, perhaps because of an ongoing struggle between Fasceau and the Action Française. In March 1926 Redier again called for his remaining followers to join Faisceau, before retiring from politics after Faisceau promised to support his career as a writer.

Later years

Redier continued to be a prolific author, although his work was not exceptional. His book La Guerre des femmes (1923) had won an award from the Academy. This book, which recorded the lives of women fighters such as Louise de Bettignies, was the basis for the 1937 film Sœurs d'armes by Léon Poirier. The role of Louise was played by Jeanne Sully. His Jeanne de France (1950) also won an award from the Academy.

Redier was married to French resistance fighter, Marie Léonie Vanhoutte on 19 July 1934 in Paris. Attendees at their wedding included Maxim Weygand, André Tardieu, and Henri Gouraud.

Redier died on 27 July 1954 in Paris.

Bibliography

 (Essay)
 (novel)
 (novel)
 (essays)
 (novel)

 (Essay)

 (biography)
 (biography)
 (biography)
 (essay))
 (novel)
 (biography)
 (essay)

 (biography)
 (essay)
 (novel)
 (biography)

References

Sources

1873 births
1954 deaths
20th-century French novelists
French biographers
French journalists
People from Meudon
French male essayists
French male novelists
20th-century French essayists
20th-century French male writers
Male biographers